The Chinese flying frog or Chinese gliding frog (Zhangixalus dennysi) is a species of tree frog in the family Rhacophoridae found in China, Laos, Burma, and Vietnam. It is also known as Blanford's whipping frog, large treefrog, and Denny's whipping frog.

Its natural habitats are subtropical or tropical moist lowland forest, subtropical or tropical moist montane forest, rivers, swamps, freshwater marshes, intermittent freshwater marshes, ponds, irrigated land, and canals, and ditches.

Females lay eggs in foam nests attached to branches and grasses hanging over water. They create nests by beating a frothy secretion into foam with their hind legs.

It is considered Least Concern by the IUCN.

References

External links

Zhangixalus
Amphibians of Myanmar
Amphibians of China
Amphibians of Laos
Amphibians of Vietnam
Amphibians described in 1881
Taxa named by William Thomas Blanford
Taxonomy articles created by Polbot